Tracy Maureen Perez (born March 23, 1993) is a Filipino model, industrial engineer and beauty pageant titleholder who was crowned Miss World Philippines 2021. She represented the Philippines at the Miss World 2021 pageant in San Juan, Puerto Rico and finished as a Top 13 semifinalist.

Early life and education
Tracy Maureen Perez was born premature on March 23, 1993 in Cebu City, Philippines, to a single mother, Chona Asibal Perez. Perez's mother, a former beauty queen herself (Binibining Cebu finalist and  Binibining Pilipinas 1979 candidate), was originally from Bayugan, Agusan del Sur in Mindanao but then moved to Cebu in the Visayas.

Perez graduated from the University of San Carlos with a degree in industrial engineering.

Pageantry

Miss World Philippines 2019
Perez joined Miss World Philippines 2019 as her first national pageant. She placed in to the top 12 to eventual winner Michelle Dee by the end of the event.

Miss Universe Philippines 2020
Perez competed in the Miss Universe Philippines 2020 pageant. She placed top 16 to eventual winner Rabiya Mateo of Iloilo City.
 Special Awards:
 Miss Photogenic
 Best in Swimsuit Photo

Miss World Philippines 2021
In October 2021, Perez competed at the Miss World Philippines 2021 pageant for the second time, where she clinched the Miss World Philippines 2021 title. During the coronation night, she slipped on the edge of the platform after fixing her stance and fell down the stairs of the stage before the announcing of winners. Then she fell a second time shortly after she was crowned, during her first walk as the reigning queen, causing her crown to slip from her head. Perez will compete at the Miss World 2021 pageant in Puerto Rico in December 2021.
 Special Awards:
 Miss Blue Water Day Spa
 Miss Artopian International
 Miss Bench
 Miss Dermfix
 Best in Swimsuit

Miss World 2021

Perez was declared one of the winners of the Miss World 2021 Beauty with a Purpose competition, as well as of the head-to-head challenge, securing a spot in the semifinals. She also revealed she will be wearing a national costume inspired by the goddess Mayari, for the Dances of the World segment on finals night. Mayari, in Philippine mythology, is the ruler of the moon and the most beautiful deity in the celestial court.
 Special Awards:
 Head-to-Head Challenge
 Beauty with a Purpose

Perez concluded her Miss World journey as a Top 13 semifinalist. Karolina Bielawska of Poland won the said pageant.

References

External links

Living people
Miss World 2021 delegates
Miss World Philippines winners
Miss Universe Philippines contestants
Filipino female models
1993 births
Cebuano beauty pageant winners